The 1973 Welwyn Hatfield District Council election took place on 7 June 1973 to elect members of Welwyn Hatfield District Council in England. This was on the same day as other local elections.

This was the inaugural election of Welwyn Hatfield District Council.

Summary

Election result

|}

References

Welwyn Hatfield
Welwyn Hatfield Borough Council elections
1970s in Hertfordshire